The fifteenth series of Ballando con le Stelle was broadcast from 19 September 2020 to 21 November 2020 on RAI 1 and was presented by Milly Carlucci with Paolo Belli and his Big Band.

Couples

Notes

15
2020 Italian television seasons